Hundhammer is a German surname. Notable people with the surname include:

Alois Hundhammer (1900–1974), German politician
Beate Heieren Hundhammer (born 1968), Norwegian politician
Markus Hundhammer (born 1980), German ice hockey player

German-language surnames